Nicholas Tavelic was a Croatian Franciscan friar and missionary who died a martyr's death in Jerusalem on November 14, 1391. He was beatified as part of Nicholas Tavelic, O.F.M. and companions, which included friars from Italy and France. All four members of his group have been declared saints by the Catholic Church, making Tavelic the first Croatian saint.

Life 

Most sources mention Šibenik as Tavelic's birthplace, but another possible location is Velim near Stankovci. In 1365, Tavelic became a friar in Bribir, the seat of the Šubić, a powerful Croatian noble family.

Tavelic was among 60 friars from various Franciscan provinces who answered an appeal by the Bosnian guardian, motivated by a papal bull, Prae cunctis, issued in 1291 by Pope Nicholas IV, himself a Friar Minor, to work as missionaries in Bosnia, combating the perceived heresies of the Bosnian Church. Tavelic spread Catholicism around Bosnia for 12 years. In his report to the pope, the Bosnian guardian later said that the missionaries converted around 50,000 members of that Church.

In 1384, Tavelic went to serve in the Custody of the Holy Land where he met the friars Deodatus Aribert of Rodez,  and Stephen of Cuneo. The four lived at the Monastery of Mount Zion, the ancient friary maintained by the Friars Minor in the city, where they spent several years learning Arabic and serving at the holy sites connected to Jesus' life, which had been entrusted to the care of the Order of Friars Minor and which still drew pilgrims from Christian Europe.

After having seen few, if any, conversions from the Muslim populace of the city resulting from their quiet pastoral work at the holy sites of Christianity, Tavelic and his colleagues decided to take the option given to them in the Rule of Life of their founder, Francis of Assisi, and to preach openly the Christian faith to the Muslim populace. They went to the regular gathering before the Qadi of Jerusalem and began to preach.  Following their arrest for this, they refused the option to convert to Islam and were imprisoned. After again refusing to convert several days later, the group were all sentenced to death. These missionaries were executed near the Jaffa Gate on November 14, 1391, and their remains completely burned.

Veneration 

Friar Gerard Chalvet, O.F.M., was the guardian of the Jerusalem friary and saw their executions. Together with Friar Martin of Šibenik, he sent a detailed report to Europe: the pope, Leipzig, Šibenik and elsewhere. Tavelic and his companions were soon celebrated as  martyrs by Franciscans all over Europe, especially in Šibenik.

Five centuries later, in 1880, Antun Josip Fosco, the Bishop of the Roman Catholic Diocese of Šibenik, started the procedure for the Holy See for the formal beatification of Tavelic. By a special decree, Pope Leo XIII recognized his ancient cultus for the Šibenik Diocese in 1889 and for the entire Franciscan Order in 1898. Two years later, the same thing was done for the Holy Land.

The cult of the friars, especially that of Tavelic, grew between the World Wars. The cultus of the other three martyrs was recognized by Pope Paul VI in 1966, with a separate feast day of 17 November. The four friars were canonized together by Pope Paul VI in front of 20,000 Croats in Vatican City, on June 21, 1970, with their conjoined feast day being 14 November.

Churches 

Most churches dedicated to Tavelić are located in Croatia. Some of them are in Banjevci, Cerovac, Lišani, Perković, Split, Vinjani, Zagreb, Rijeka and Županja. Churches abroad can be found in Hurlingham, Buenos Aires in Argentina, Montreal and Winnipeg in Canada, Melbourne and Sydney in Australia and Tomislavgrad in Bosnia-Herzegovina

References 

D. Mandić: Documenta martyrii beati Tavelic, Roma 1958.
A. Crnica, Historico-iuridica dilucidatio vitae, martyrii et gloriae beati N. Tavelic, Roma 1958,

1340 births
1391 deaths
People from Šibenik
Croatian Friars Minor
14th-century Croatian Roman Catholic priests
Franciscan missionaries
Martyred Roman Catholic priests
Franciscan martyrs
Franciscan saints
14th-century Christian saints
Croatian Roman Catholic saints
Beatifications by Pope Paul VI
Canonizations by Pope Paul VI
Groups of Christian martyrs of the Middle Ages
Croatian Franciscans